The In Crowd is the second album by Kidz in the Hall, released on May 13, 2008, by Duck Down Records. The first single released was "Drivin' Down the Block".

The album received mostly favourable reviews from critics who cited it to be an improvement on their debut, with Double-0's production in particular receiving credit.

Track listing

References

External links
"The Black Out" - Review Of Kidz In The Hall’s The In Crowd

Kidz in the Hall albums
2008 albums
Albums produced by Double-O
Albums produced by Black Milk
Duck Down Music albums